The African Woman (also known as The Woman from Africa) is a 1990 West German-Italian-French romance-drama film directed by Margarethe von Trotta. It was entered into the main competition at the 47th Venice International Film Festival.

Cast 

 Stefania Sandrelli as Anna 
 Barbara Sukowa as Martha
 Sami Frey as Victor
 Jan Biczycki as Swinarski (as Jan Paul Biczycki)
 Alexandre Mnouchkine as Andrej
 Jacques Sernas as Dr. Wargnier
 Kadidia Diarra as Kind
 Pierre Deny as Journalist 
 Bernard Tachl as Hausmeister

References

External links

1990 films
1990 romantic drama films
West German films
German romantic drama films
French romantic drama films
Italian romantic drama films
Films directed by Margarethe von Trotta
1990s German-language films
1990s French films
1990s German films